The United States, Venezuela, Cuba, and the People's Republic of China have embassies in Grenada. Grenada has been recognized by most members of the United Nations and maintains diplomatic missions in the United Kingdom, the United States, Venezuela, and Canada.

Grenada is a member of the Caribbean Development Bank, CARICOM, the Organization of Eastern Caribbean States (OECS), and the Commonwealth of Nations. It joined the United Nations in 1974, and the World Bank, the International Monetary Fund, and the Organization of American States in 1975. Grenada also is a member of the Eastern Caribbean's Regional Security System (RSS).

In December 2014, Grenada joined Bolivarian Alliance for the Peoples of Our America (ALBA) as a full member. Prime minister Mitchell said that the  membership was a natural extension of the co-operation Grenada have had over the years with both Cuba and Venezuela.

Bilateral relations

International recognition of Grenada

Non-UN member states

Grenada and the Commonwealth of Nations

Grenada has been an independent Commonwealth realm since 1974.

Even under the People's Revolutionary Government, Grenada was never declared a republic, but remained a Commonwealth realm, albeit, under the dictatorship of the New Jewel Movement's leader, Maurice Bishop.

Illicit drugs

Small-scale cannabis cultivation; lesser transshipment point for cannabis and cocaine to the US.

See also

 List of diplomatic missions in Grenada
 List of diplomatic missions of Grenada

References

 
Government of Grenada
Politics of Grenada
Grenada and the Commonwealth of Nations